Mohammad Hassanzadeh Saberi Akhlaghi (born October 6, 1990 in Shiraz) is an Iranian professional basketball player. He currently plays for Foolad Mahan in the Iranian Super League as well as for the Iranian national basketball team, as a forward. He participated in his first major international competition for the Iranian team at the 2010 FIBA World Championship in Turkey.

Honours

National team
 Qualify To 2009 FIBA Under-19 World Championship with Iran national basketball team
 Qualify To 2010 FIBA Basketball World Cup with Iran national basketball team
 Qualify To 2019 FIBA Basketball World Cup with Iran national basketball team
 Qualify To the 2020 Olympic with the Iranian national team
 Asian Under-18 Championship
 2008 FIBA Asia Under-18 Championship - Gold Medal
 FIBA Asia Cup 2008 Tokushima - Gold Medal
 2015 FIBA Asia Championship - Bronze Medal
 William Jones Cup 2015 - Gold Medal
 William Jones Cup 2014 - Silver Medal
 FIBA Asia Cup 2013 - Gold Medal
 2012 FIBA Asia Cup - Gold Medal
 2014 FIBA Asia Cup - Gold Medal
 2016 FIBA Asia Challenge - Gold Medal

External links
 Mohammad Hasanzadeh on Instagram
 Profile
 Asia-Basket Profile
 www.fiba.basketball
 archive.fiba.com

1990 births
Living people
Iranian men's basketball players
People from Shiraz
Power forwards (basketball)
Basketball players at the 2018 Asian Games
Asian Games silver medalists for Iran
Medalists at the 2018 Asian Games
Asian Games medalists in basketball
2010 FIBA World Championship players
2019 FIBA Basketball World Cup players
Basketball players at the 2020 Summer Olympics
Olympic basketball players of Iran
Sportspeople from Fars province